Gasteen is a surname. Notable people with the surname include:

 Francesca Gasteen, Australian actress 
 Jim Gasteen (1922–2017), Australian farmer and conservationist
 Lisa Gasteen (born 1957), Australian operatic soprano